Bjørg Mikalsen (born 8 February 1945) is a Norwegian politician for the Liberal Party. She served as a deputy representative to the Norwegian Parliament from Sogn og Fjordane during the term 2005 to 2009. In total she met during 16 days of parliamentary session.

References

1945 births
Living people
Liberal Party (Norway) politicians
Deputy members of the Storting
People from Sogn og Fjordane
Place of birth missing (living people)
21st-century Norwegian women politicians
21st-century Norwegian politicians
Women members of the Storting